Hector Sévin (22 March 1852 – 4 May 1916) was a Cardinal of the Roman Catholic Church and was former Archbishop of Lyon.

Hector Sévin was born in Simandre, France. He was educated at the Seminary of Belley and he received the diaconate on 22 May 1875.

Priesthood
He was ordained on 7 June 1876. He served as subdirector of the institute for the deaf and mute in Bourg from 1875 until 1876 then as Professor of dogmatic theology, Scriptures, and ecclesiastical history at the Seminary of Belley from 1876 until 1889 and was its rector from 1889 to 1891. He was the Vicar general of the diocese of Belley in 1904.

Episcopate
He was appointed as bishop of Châlons on 11 February 1908 by Pope Pius X. He was consecrated on 5 April 1908 in the cathedral of Belley, by Louis Luçon, Cardinal Archbishop of Reims. He was promoted to metropolitan see of Lyon on 12 December 1912.

Cardinalate
He was created Cardinal-Priest of  SS. Trinità al Monte Pincio in the consistory of May 25, 1914 by Pope Pius X. He took part in the conclave of 1914 that elected Pope Benedict XV. He died in 1916.

1852 births
1916 deaths
20th-century French cardinals
Bishops of Châlons-sur-Marne
Archbishops of Lyon
Cardinals created by Pope Pius X